The 2014 Big Ten Conference baseball tournament was held at TD Ameritrade Park in Omaha, NE from May 21 through 25.  The eight team, double-elimination tournament determined the league champion for the 2014 NCAA Division I baseball season.  Indiana won their second consecutive, and fourth overall, tournament championship and claimed the Big Ten Conference's automatic bid to the 2014 NCAA Division I baseball tournament.  The event was aired on the Big Ten Network.  This was the first time the event was held in Omaha and the first time it featured eight teams.

Format and seeding
The 2014 tournament was an 8 team double-elimination tournament.  The top eight teams based on conference regular season winning percentage earned invitations to the tournament.  The teams then played a double-elimination tournament leading to a single championship game.  This was the first year of this format in the Big Ten.

Tournament

All-Tournament Team
The following players were named to the All-Tournament Team.

Most Outstanding Player
Kyle Schwarber, an outfielder for Indiana, was named Tournament Most Valuable Player.

References

Tournament
Big Ten Baseball Tournament
Big Ten Conference baseball
Big Ten baseball tournament